Onchidium is a genus of air-breathing sea slugs, shell-less marine pulmonate gastropod mollusks in the family Onchidiidae. There are only four species currently recognized in the genus.

Species
The following species with valid names are included within the genus Onchidium :
 Onchidium melakense Dayrat & Goulding, 2019
 Onchidium multiradiatum C. Semper, 1882
 Onchidium nebulosum C. Semper, 1880
 Onchidium reevesii (J. E. Gray, 1850)
 Onchidium stuxbergi (Westerlund, 1883)
 Onchidium typhae Buchannan, 1800
Onchidium multinotatum, originally described within the genus in 1883, is regarded as a nomen dubium.

References

 Starobogatov, Y. I. (1970). Fauna Molliuskov i Zoogeograficheskoe Raionirovanie Kontinental'nykh Vodoemov Zemnogo Shara [The Molluscan Fauna and Zoogeographical Zoning of the Continental Water Bodies of the World]. Nauka. Leningrad. 372 p., 12 tables
 Labbé A. (1935). Sur une forme nouvelle de Silicoderme, Elophilus ajuthiae nov. gen. nov. sp. Bulletin de la Société Zoologique de France. 60: 312-317

External links
 Buchannan, F. (1800). An account of the Onchidium, a new genus of the class of vermes, found in Bengal. Transactions of the Linnean Society of London. 5: 132–134, pl. 5.
 Dayrat B., Goulding T.C., Apte D., Bhave V., Comendador J., Quang N.X., Tan S.K. & Tan S.H. (2016). Integrative taxonomy of the genus Onchidium Buchannan, 1800 (Mollusca, Gastropoda, Pulmonata, Onchidiidae). ZooKeys. 636: 1-40

Onchidiidae